Naked: Stories of Men is a 1996 Australian anthology television series. It consisted of six self-contained contemporary dramas centred on the theme of masculinity and what it means to be a man in the world today.

Naked was nominated for the Australian Film Institute (AFI) Award for Best Telefeature or Mini Series, for the episode "The Fisherman's Wake".

Episodes

References

External links

1996 Australian television series debuts
1996 Australian television series endings
Australian Broadcasting Corporation original programming
English-language television shows
Television shows set in Australia
Australian anthology television series